Thoralf Glad (February 1, 1878 – July 17, 1969) was a Norwegian sailor who competed in the 1912 Summer Olympics. He was a crew member of the Norwegian boat Taifun, which won the gold medal in the 8 metre class.

References

External links
Olympic database profile

1878 births
1969 deaths
Norwegian male sailors (sport)
Sailors at the 1912 Summer Olympics – 8 Metre
Olympic sailors of Norway
Olympic gold medalists for Norway
Olympic medalists in sailing
Medalists at the 1912 Summer Olympics